Carl Heinrich Stratz (14 June 1858 in Odessa – 21 April 1924 in the Hague) was a German-Russian gynecologist who was one of the first to research human growth and development.

References

Further reading
 Entry in Isidor Fischer's (publisher): Biographisches Lexikon der hervorragenden Ärzte der letzten fünfzig Jahre. Urban & Schwarzenberg, Wien 1962, S. 1525.
 H. Grimm: Carl Heinrich Stratz (1858 bis 1924) als Mitbegründer einer Ärztlichen Jugendkunde. In: Ärztliche Jugendkunde. Band 70, Nr. 3, Juni 1979, S. 177–192.
 Michael Hau: The Holistic Gaze in German Medicine, 1890–1930. In: Bulletin of the History of Medicine. Band 74, Nr. 3, 2000, S. 495–524.
 Michael Hau: Körperbildung und sozialer Habitus. Soziale Bedeutungen von Körperlichkeit während des Kaiserreichs und der Weimarer Republik. In: Rüdiger vom Bruch, Brigitte Kaderas (Hrsg.): Wissenschaften und Wissenschaftspolitik. Bestandsaufnahmen zu Formationen, Brüchen und Kontinuitäten im Deutschland des 20. Jahrhunderts. Steiner, Stuttgart 2002, S. 109–124.
 Michael Hau: The Cult of Health and Beauty in Germany. A social history, 1890–1930. The University of Chicago Press, Chicago 2003, .

External links

 Literature by and on Carl Heinrich Stratz in the Deutschen Nationalbibliothek catalogue
 Literature list in online-catalogue of the Staatsbibliothek zu Berlin
 Pencil portrait of Carl Heinrich Stratz

German gynaecologists
1858 births
1924 deaths
Russian people of German descent
19th-century German physicians
20th-century German physicians
19th-century German scientists
20th-century German scientists
Physicians from Odesa
Scientists from Odesa